Route 211 is a collector road in the Canadian province of Nova Scotia. It is located in Guysborough County and connects Stillwater on Trunk 7 to Isaac's Harbour North on Route 316.

Communities
Stillwater
Jordanville
Indian Harbour Lake
Port Hilford
Harpellville
Port Bickerton
Isaac's Harbour North

See also
List of Nova Scotia provincial highways

References

Roads in Guysborough County, Nova Scotia
Nova Scotia provincial highways